Coleophora elamita is a moth of the family Coleophoridae.

References

elamita
Moths described in 1994